Kristin Ytterstad Pettersen (born 1969) is a Norwegian engineer whose research involves nonlinear control theory and its application to controlling the motion of both watercraft and snakebots. She is a professor of engineering cybernetics at the Norwegian University of Science and Technology, and the founder of Eelume AS.

Education and career
Pettersen was born on 28 January 1969 in Fana. She earned a master's degree in engineering cybernetics from the Norwegian Institute of Technology in 1991, and completed a Ph.D. at the Norwegian University of Science and Technology (NTNU) in 1996. She joined the NTNU faculty in the same year. She was head of the department of engineering cybernetics from 2011 to 2013, and worked as CEO of Eelume from 2015 to 2016.

Books
Pettersen is the coauthor of two books in the Springer-Verlag Advances in Industrial Control Series: Snake Robots: Modelling, Mechatronics, and Control (with Pål Liljebäck, Øyvind Stavdahl, and Jan Tommy Gravdahl, 2013) and Vehicle-Manipulator Systems: Modeling for Simulation, Analysis, and Control (with Pål Johan From and Jan Tommy Gravdahl, 2014).

Recognition
Pettersen is a member of the Royal Norwegian Society of Sciences and Letters, elected in 2018, and was also elected to the Norwegian Academy of Technological Sciences in 2013. She became a Fellow of the IEEE in 2017.

She is the 2020 winner of the Hendrik W. Bode Lecture Prize of the IEEE Control Systems Society.

Pettersen was awarded an ERC Advanced Grant for her project CRÈME – Control of light vehicle-manipulator systems in 2021.

References

External links
Home page

1969 births
Living people
Norwegian Institute of Technology alumni
Norwegian University of Science and Technology alumni
Academic staff of the Norwegian University of Science and Technology
Fellow Members of the IEEE
Members of the Norwegian Academy of Technological Sciences
Royal Norwegian Society of Sciences and Letters
European Research Council grantees